The Jaipur–Hyderabad Weekly Express is an Express train belonging to South Central Railway zone that runs between  and  in India. It is currently being operated with 17020/17019 train numbers on a weekly basis.

Service

The 17019/Jaipur–Hyderabad Weekly Express has an average speed of 49 km/hr and covers 2004 km in 41h 10m. The 17020/Hyderabad–Jaipur Weekly Express has an average speed of 51 km/hr and covers 2004 km in 39h 10m.

Route and halts 

The important halts of the train are:

Coach composition

The train has standard LHB rakes with a max speed of 110 kmph. The train consists of 23 coaches:

 1 AC II Tier
 4 AC III Tier
 10 Sleeper coaches
 6 General Unreserved
 2 Seating cum Luggage Rake

Traction

Both trains are hauled by a Moula Ali Loco Shed or Kazipet Loco Shed-based twins WDM-3A diesel locomotive from Jaipur to Hyderabad and vice versa.

Rake sharing

The train shares its rake with 17005/17006 Hyderabad–Raxaul Express.

Direction reversal

The train reverses its direction 1 times:

See also 

 Jaipur Junction railway station
 Hyderabad Deccan railway station
 Hyderabad–Raxaul Express

Notes

References

External links 

 17019/Jaipur - Hyderabad Weekly Express India Rail Info
 17020/Hyderabad - Jaipur Weekly Express India Rail Info

Transport in Hyderabad, India
Transport in Jaipur
Express trains in India
Rail transport in Rajasthan
Rail transport in Madhya Pradesh
Rail transport in Maharashtra
Rail transport in Telangana
Railway services introduced in 2012